The Ilva Trophy is a defunct WTA Tour affiliated women's tennis tournament played from 1984 to 1994, with the exception of 1986 and 1987. It was held in Taranto, Italy and played on outdoor clay courts. It was a Tier V tournaments from 1990 until 1992 and was promoted to Tier IV for its last two years.

Finals

Singles

Doubles

References
 WTA Results Archive

 
Clay court tennis tournaments
Defunct tennis tournaments in Italy
WTA Tour